Strast (trans. Passion) is the third studio album from Serbian rock band Van Gogh, released 1993.

The album was produced by Saša Habić, except for the track "Strast" which was produced by Vladimir Barjakaterević.

Track listing
All songs were written by Zvonimir Đukić, except where noted
"Basna"  – 3:45
"Buldožer"  (Z. Đukić, A. Barać) – 3:22
"Muzička kuća"  – 3:31
"Sreća"  – 5:57
"Strast"  – 3:40
"Mama"  – 4:42
"Manitua Mi"  – 4:04
"Haleluja"  – 3:31
"Extaza"  – 3:08
"Vahađa  – 1:09

Personnel
Zvonimir Đukić - guitar, vocals
Aleksandar Barać - bass guitar
Srboljub Radivojević - drums

Guest musicians
Dragoslav Stanisavljević - trumpet
Marija Mihajlović - vocals
Marko Đorđević - trumpet
Pera Joe - harmonica
Rambo Amadeus - guitar

Legacy 
The song "Mama" was polled in 2000 as 52nd on Rock Express Top 100 Yugoslav Rock Songs of All Times list.

References 

Strast at Discogs
 EX YU ROCK enciklopedija 1960-2006,  Janjatović Petar;

External links
Strast at Discogs

1993 albums
Van Gogh (band) albums
PGP-RTS albums